The Catholic Church in Kenya is part of the worldwide Catholic Church, under the spiritual leadership of the Kenyan Conference of Catholic Bishops and the Pope in the Vatican City.

The earliest traces of the Catholic Church in Kenya begin with the missionaries that penetrated the state in 1498, led by Vasco da Gama. Due to regional conflict, poor transportation, and a largely nomadic presence, it became more established in northern Kenya during the twentieth century.

The Catholic Church is the world's largest Christian Church, and its largest religious grouping. There are an estimated 7.5 million baptised Catholics in Kenya, approximately 33% of the population.

Organization 
Within Kenya the hierarchy consists of:
 Archbishopric
 Bishopric

 Kisumu
 Bungoma
 Eldoret
 Homa Bay
 Kakamega
 Kisii
 Kitale
 Lodwar

 Mombasa
 Garissa
 Malindi

 Nairobi
 Kericho
 Kitui
 Machakos
 Nakuru
 Ngong

 Nyeri
 Embu
 Maralal
 Marsabit
 Meru
 Murang'a
 Nyahururu

Notable Catholics in Kenya 

 Moody Awori, former Vice President of Kenya
 Teresia Mbari Hinga, professor at Santa Clara University
 Ngina Kenyatta, former First Lady of Kenya
 Uhuru Kenyatta, President of Kenya
 Mwai Kibaki, former President of Kenya
 Patrick Ngugi Njoroge, governor of the Central Bank of Kenya.

See also
 Vicariate Apostolic of Isiolo
 List of saints from Africa

References

External links
 Kenya Episcopal Conference

 
Kenya